The 5'11" Record (pronounced "The Five Eleven Record") is an album from Chapel Hill, North Carolina-based band Arrogance, spanning material recorded between 1976 and 1982, before the band's breakup in late 1983. The 5'11" part of the title is in the English units notation for height, meaning five feet, eleven inches, which refers to the average height of the band members. The title relates to the name the band sent these songs under back in the 1980s, looking for a new record deal.[] It was released in 2002 in celebration of the band's thirtieth anniversary and temporary reunification. Its release corresponded with the Arrogance concert at the Regency Park Amphitheatre in Cary, North Carolina, which was organized to promote the new CD, as well as the re-releases of Arrogance's past albums on CD.

Track listing
 "Praying Mantis" (Dixon) – 3:52
 "Nothing to Fear" (Kirkland) – 4:04
 "Southside Girl" (Dixon) – 2:57
 "Uh Oh" (Kirkland) – 3:42
 "Eyes On Fire" (Dixon) – 3:19
 "She's So Dirty" (Kirkland) – 3:00
 "Talk to Me" (Dixon) – 2:54
 "Ice On the River" (Dixon) – 3:16
 "Where Are You" (Kirkland) – 3:44
 "Andy" (Dixon) – 3:20
 "Perfect Light" (Kirkland) – 3:28
 "Just Rites" (Dixon) – 4:40
 "Ain't Enough" (Kirkland) – 4:29
 "White Lies" (Abernethy) – 3:29
 "(You're a) Big Girl Now" (Dixon) – 3:06
 "Nigel's Mind" (Kirkland) – 4:29
 "Remember" (Abernethy) – 3:35
 "Velvet Elvis" (Davison) – 3:08
 "Wasting Time" (Abernethy) – 3:09
 "Beer & Whiskey" (Kirkland) – 3:57
 "Juggling Time" (Dixon) – 3:04
 "Waiting" (Stout) – 1:51

Personnel 
Arrogance
Don Dixon – bass, vocals
Robert Kirkland – guitars, vocals
Marty Stout – keyboards
Rod Abernethy – guitar, vocals
Scott Davison – drums

Recording information 
Tracks 1–12, 18: recorded at Reflection Sound Studios, 1982
Track 13: recorded at Audiofonics, 1978
Tracks 14–15: recorded at Audiofonics, 1981
Track 16: recorded at The Crest, 1977
Track 17 and 19: recorded at Drive In Studios, 1980
Track 20: recorded at Don Dixon's house, 1976
Track 21: recorded at Robert Kirkland's house, 1977
Track 22: recorded at Reflection Sound Studios, 1977

References

2002 compilation albums
Arrogance (band) albums